Edward David Stuart Ogilvie (25 July 1814 – 25 January 1896) was an English-born Australian politician and businessman. He served as a member of the Upper House of the New South Wales parliament. He built the renowned estate Yulgilbar.

Biography

He was born in Tottenham to Mary and William Ogilvie, a Royal Navy officer of Clan Ogilvie. He and his family migrated to Sydney in 1825, and Ogilvie worked for his father on stations on the Upper Hunter and Liverpool Plains, developing a property called Yulgilbar along with his brother W. K. Ogilvie and C. G. Tindal, the son of his father's Royal Navy colleague.

By 1850, Yulgilbar was approximately 777 square kilometres in territory. Ogilvie befriended the local Aboriginals, employing them where they were willing and allowing them their land rights with respect to his. He began buying the territories that would be amalgamated as Yulgilbar from 1853, eventually bequeathing it to his children. In the 1860s, Ogilvie moved from sheep to cattle. Australian artist Tom Roberts described Ogilvie as "The Chief, mentally alert, a military-type in mind and physique." 

Ogilvie had his 10 children by Theodosia de Burgh, who he married on 2 September 1858 and who died in 1886. He married Alicia Georgiana Loftus Tottenham on 21 December 1890. In 1863, he was appointed to the New South Wales Legislative Council. His seat on the council was declared vacant on 27 February 1889 because he had been absent from the council for 2 continuous sessions. Ogilvie died at Fernside near Bowral in 1896.

His granddaughter Jessie, Lady Street was a prominent human rights activist who married into the Street dynasty. His great-great-granddaughter is Dame Bridget Ogilvie,  (born 24 March 1938), a prominent Australian scientist.

His renowned estate Yulgilbar remained in his family until the 1920s when it was sold by his daughter and son-in-law. In 1949, it was acquired by Samuel Hordern and was passed by descent to his daughter Sarah Myer on his death is 1961.

See also
 Clan Ogilvie

References

 Parliamentary papers
 'Australian Royalty' profile

1814 births
1896 deaths
Members of the New South Wales Legislative Council
People from Tottenham
English emigrants to Australia
Australian pastoralists
19th-century Australian politicians
19th-century Australian businesspeople